Iste confessor is a Latin hymn used in the Divine Office at Lauds and Vespers on feasts of confessors. It exists in two forms. Iste confessor Domini sacratus is the original 8th Century hymn and Iste confessor Domini colentes is a 1632 edition, published by Pope Urban VIII with improved Latin style. The hymn is written in Sapphic and Adonic meter.

History
The earliest versions of the hymn can be found in 8th century manuscripts for the feast of St Martin of Tours (d.397) and this is reflected in the third verse which originally referred to the shrine of St Martin which was an extremely popular pilgrimage site for the sick. Although St Martin was a bishop and confessor, the hymn was gradually extended and came to be used for all confessors, including non-bishops in the Roman Breviary and other Latin liturgical rites. In the reforms following the Second Vatican Council, the 1974 Liturgy of the Hours has attempted to restore the hymn for primary use with bishop confessors, however it retains its more general usage where the pre-1974 Liturgies (such as the Roman Breviary) are used.

Text of Hymn
The Roman Breviary published by Pope Urban VIII had two variations for the 3rd and 4th lines of this hymn: "Hac die laetus méruit beátas Scándere sedes" on the day of the confessor's death, otherwise it was changed to "Hac die laetus méruit suprémos Laudis honóres." This decree became known as the "mutator tertius versus." In 1955, reforms to the rubrics of the Breviary and Calendar removed the decree and kept the latter text, ie. "méruit suprémos Laudis honóres."

Iste confessor Domini colentes

1 Iste confessor Domini colentes
  Quem pie laudant populi per orbem:
  Hac die lætus meruit beatas
  Scandere sedes.
 [If it is not the day of his death,
 the last line is changed to:]
  Hac die lætus meruit supremos
  Laudis honores.

2 Qui pius, prudens, humilis, pudicus,
  Sobriam duxit sine labe vitam,
  Donec humanos animavit auræ
  Spiritus artus.

3 Cuius ob præstans meritum frequenter,
  Ægra quæ passim iacuere membra,
  Viribus morbi domitis, saluti
  Restituuntur.

4 Noster hinc illi chorus obsequentem
  Concinit laudem, celebresque palmas;
  Ut piis eius precibus iuvemur
  Omne per ævum.

5 Sit salus illi, decus, atque virtus,
  Qui super cæli solio coruscans,
  Totius mundi seriem gubernat
  Trinus et unus. Amen.

Iste confessor Domini sacratus
1 Iste Confessor Domini sacratus,
  Festa plebs cuius celebrat per orbem,
  Hodie lætus meruit secreta
  Scandere cæli.

2 Qui pius, prudens, humilis, pudicus,
  Sobrius, castus fuit, et quietus,
  Vita dum præsens vegetavit eius
  Corporis artus.

3 Ad sacrum cuius tumulum frequenter,
  Membra languentum  modo sanitati,
  Quolibet morbo fuerint gravata,
  Restituuntur.

4 Unde nunc noster chorus in honorem
  Ipsius, hymnum canit hunc libenter,
  Ut piis eius meritis iuvemur
  Omne per ævum.

5 Sit salus illi, decus, atque virtus,
  Qui supra cæli residens cacumen,
  Totius mundi machinam gubernat
  Trinus et unus. Amen.

English Versions
Due to differences between the Latin versions of the hymn, and due to the demands of rendering the original Latin into metrical English which was suitable for singing, the translations below are thematically accurate, rather than literal translations.

This is the day whereon the Lord’s true witness
trns John O’Conner 1902

1 This is the day whereon the Lord’s true witness,
  Whom all the nations lovingly do honour,
  Worthy at least was found to wear forever
  Glory transcendent

2 Loving, far-seeing, lowly, modest minded,
  So kept he well an even course unstained
  Ever while in his frame of manhood lingered
  Life’s fitful breathings

3 Oft hath it been thro’ his sublime deserving
  Poor human bodies, howsoever stricken
  Broke and cast off the bondage of their sickness,
  Healed Divinely.

4 Wherefore to him we raise the solemn chorus,
  Chanting his praise and his surpassing triumph,
  So may his pleading help us in the battle
  All through the ages.

5 Healing and power, grace and beauteous honour
  Always be His, who shining in the highest,
  Ruleth and keepeth all the world’s vast order,
  One God, three Persons.

The Confessor of Christ, from Shore to Shore
trn Fr. Edwards Caswall, 1849

1 The Confessor of Christ, from shore to shore
  Worshipp’d with solemn rite;
  This day receives those honours which are his,
  High in the realms of light.

2 Holy and innocent were all his ways;
  Sweet, temperate, unstain’d;
  His life was prayer,—his every breath was praise,
  While breath to him remain’d.

3 Ofttimes his merits high in every land,
  In cures have been displayed;
  And still does health return at his command
  To many a frame decay’d.

4 Therefore to him triumphant praise we pay,
  And yearly songs renew;
  Praying our glorious Saint for us to pray,
  All the long ages through.

5 To God, of all the centre and the source,
  Be power and glory given;
  Who sways the mighty world through all its course,
  From the bright throne of Heaven.

He whose confession God of old accepted
Trn Laurence Housman 1906

1 He, whose confession God of old accepted,
  Whom through the ages all now hold in honour
  Gaining his guerdon this day came to enter
  Heaven’s high portal

2 God-fearing, watchful, pure of mind and body,
  Holy and humble, thus did all men find him,
  While, through his members, to the life immortal
  Mortal life called him.

3 Thus to the weary, from the life enshrined
  Potent in virtue, flowed humane compassion;
  Sick and sore laden, howsoever burdened
  There they found healing.

4 So now in chorus, giving God the glory,
  Raise we our anthem gladly to his honour,
  That in fair kinship we may all be sharers
  Here and hereafter.

5 Honour and glory, power and salvation,
  Be in the highest unto Him who reigneth
  Changeless in Heaven over earthly changes
  Triune, eternal.

See also 
Canonical Hours
Latin Psalters
Lauds
Vespers

References

External links

 Matthew Britt, The Hymns of the Breviary and Missal, Benziger Brothers, New York, 1922
 Alan Mc Dovgall, Pange Lingua: Breviary Hymns of old uses with an English rendering, Burns & Oates 1916
 Joseph Connelly, Hymns of the Roman Liturgy, 1957.
 Iste confessor Domini colentes (Plainchant version)

Iste Confessor (Liber Hymnarius)

Latin-language Christian hymns
Latin religious words and phrases
Liturgy of the Hours
Major hours
Catholic liturgy